African Holocaust is a reggae album released by Steel Pulse in July 2004.  It is Steel Pulse's eleventh album, their most recent being Mass Manipulation, released in 2019.   The album features an ample guest list headlined by fellow reggae acts Damian "Junior Gong" Marley and Capleton.  In this album Steel Pulse, with David Hinds’ signature voice leading the way, ventures further away from the dancehall persuasions apparent in their late-1980s and early-'90s work.

The album peaked at #9 on the 2004 Billboard Top Reggae Album charts.

The song "Born Fe Rebel" appears on the soundtrack of the game Tony Hawk's Underground 2.

The band released a music video in 2007 for the song "Door Of No Return" which was shot between Senegal and New York City. The video was produced by Driftwood Pictures Ltd.

Track listing
All songs written by David Hinds, except "George Jackson" (Bob Dylan)
"Global Warning" – 4:52
"Blazing Fire" (feat. Capleton) – 3:36
"There Must Be a Way" – 4:14
"Make Us a Nation" – 4:16
"Dem a Wolf" – 3:36
"No More Weapons" (feat. Damian "Junior Gong" Marley) – 4:36
"Tyrant" – 4:51
"Door of No Return" – 4:49
"Born fe Rebel" – 4:41
"Darker Than Blue" – 4:34
"George Jackson" – 3:56
"African Holocaust" (feat. Tiken Jah Fakoly) – 4:24
"Uncle George" – 4:12

References

Steel Pulse albums
2004 albums